Balakovo nuclear power station ( []) is located in the city of Balakovo, Saratov Oblast, Russia, about  south-east of Moscow. It consists of four operational reactors; a fifth unit is still under construction. Owner and operator of the nuclear power station is Rosenergoatom.

Balakovo NPP participates in a twinning program between nuclear power stations in Europe and Russia; since 1990 it has been in partnership with Biblis Nuclear Power Plant.

Reactor data 
The Balakovo Nuclear Power Plant has four operating units:

In 2018 Rosatom announced it had developed a thermal annealing technique for reactor pressure vessels which ameliorates radiation damage and extends service life by between 15 and 30 years. This had been demonstrated on unit 1.

Gallery

Incidents
On 27 June 1985 during startup of the first reactor unit, a human error (later attributed to inexperience and haste) unexpectedly opened a pressurizer relief valve, and  steam entered the staff work area. Fourteen people were killed. This event is cited as one of the predecessors of the Chernobyl disaster.

See also

 Nuclear power in Russia

References

External links
 Balakovo NPP site – website in English
 Rosenergoatom – website in Russian and English
 Bellona Foundation, Balakovo NPP – International environmental organization

Nuclear power stations built in the Soviet Union
Nuclear power stations in Russia
Buildings and structures in Saratov Oblast
Nuclear power stations with reactors under construction
Radiation accidents and incidents
Nuclear power stations using VVER reactors
1985 in the Soviet Union
1985 industrial disasters